The 2017 William Jones Cup was the 39th staging of William Jones Cup, an international basketball tournament held in Taipei, Taiwan.

Men's tournament

Participating teams

Team standings 

|}

Source:

Day 1

Day 2

Day 3

Day 4

Day 5

Day 6

Day 7

Day 8

Day 9

Women's tournament

Participating teams

Team standings 

|}

Source:

Day 1

Day 2

Day 3

Day 4

Day 5

Awards

Men's tournament

Women's tournament

Notes

References 

2017
2017 in Taiwanese sport
2017–18 in Asian basketball